Hockey Club Astana (Astana hokkeı klýby) is a professional ice hockey team based in Astana, Kazakhstan. They were founded in 2011, and play in the Kazakhstan Hockey Championship, the top level of ice hockey in Kazakhstan.

Season-by-season record
Note: GP = Games played, W = Wins, L = Losses, OTW = Overtime/shootout wins, OTL = Overtime/shootout losses, Pts = Points, GF = Goals for, GA = Goals against

Notable players
Eldar Abdulayev (born 1985), Kazakhstani ice hockey player
Maxime Moisand (born 1990), French ice hockey player
Eliezer Sherbatov (born 1991), Canadian-Israeli ice hockey player

Head coaches
Vladimir Belyaev 2011–13
Vladimir Strelchuk 2013–14
Anatoli Chistyakov 2014–15

External links
 

Ice hockey teams in Astana